Kohei Matsunaga (aka NHK yx Koyxen) is an electronic musician and draughtsman born in 1978 in Osaka, Japan, currently residing in Osaka and Berlin, Germany.

History

Kohei Matsunaga grew up in Osaka, Japan, where he studied architecture and listened to hardcore techno and rap music. His interests shifted to more experimental sounds and he started to make music in 1992, focusing on experimental music.

Matsunaga has collaborated with artists such as Conrad Schnitzler, Mika Vainio, Sean Booth from Autechre,  and more.

Discography
 1998 Upside Down (CD) Mille Plateaux 	
 2001 Split with Merzbow (CD) Tigerbeat6 	
 2002 INTO111115&111521849 / with Merzbow – Mode For Value & Intention (12") Cross Fade Enter Tainment (CFET) 	
 2002 Move Machine With Glass (CD) Gender-Less Kibbutz 	
 2002 Rudolf Eb.er & Kouhei (CD) PARA disc 	
 2002 Split with Natiho Toyota (CDr, Album, Ltd) Deserted Factory
 2003 Time To Move With Glass (12") Blade Records
 2004 Complicated High Still Now... (CDr, Ltd) Autarkeia 	
 2004 Split with John Watermann (CD) Hvexas Records 	
 2004 Split with Niko Skorpio (CD) Deserted Factory 	
 2005 Courtis_Matsunaga (CD, Album) Prele 	
 2005 For Gemini And Back To Heian (CD, Mini) Feld 	 	
 2006 Sensational Meets Kouhei (CD, Album, Enh, Dig) WordSound 	
 2007 YAK (with Y-tong-G, Asmus Tietchens),(CD, Ltd) Monochrome Vision 	
 2008 NHK (12") Raster noton
 2009 e?
 2010 Split with Mika Vainio (12") Important Records
 2010 3.Telepathics Meh in-Sect Connection (with Mika Vainio, Sean Booth) (CD) Important Record
 2010 Self VA. (CD) Important Records
 2010 Sensational meets koyxeи (LP, CD) SKAM Records
 2011 Split with Asmus Tietchens (12") Important Records
 2011 NHKyx yx aka 1ch aka solo (CD) SKAM Records
 2012 Split with SND (12") PAN
 2012 Dance Classics Vol.I (12") PAN
 2012 Dance Classics Vol.II (12") PAN
 2013 Dance Classics Vol.III (12") PAN
 2013 Drawings (Book+7") Fang Bomb
 2015 Hallucinogenic doom steppy verbs (12") Diagonal
 2015 Terepa (12") Other People
 2016 Doom steppy revarb (12") Diagonal
 2017 Exit Entrance (12") DFA Records
 2018 Parallel tempo (12") OUS
 2018 Reflexes (Cass) DFA Records 
 2019 Panorama walking with the birds and the water decorative sound landscape (CD) Tamaki Niime
 2019 Self split (12") Diagonal

Other projects

 NHK
 NHK bs
 NHK yx
 NHK'koyxeи
 NHK rmx
 MOU
 Koyxeи
 Internet magic
 NHK yx Koyxen
 Terepa

External links
 Blog – Koyxen
 Kohei Matsunaga – Discography – Discogs

Living people
Japanese musicians
Musicians from Osaka
Year of birth missing (living people)